Komati Power Station, is a coal-fired power plant operated by Eskom. Its 300 metre tall chimney was built in 1979, and is one of the tallest structures in the country. Komati is one of power stations with a common steam range, meaning that its nine boilers jointly feed the nine generators. Other stations are Tutuka Power Station and Matimba Power Station.

History
The first unit was commissioned in 1961 and the last in 1966. In 1988, three units at Komati were mothballed, one was kept in reserve and the other five were only operated during peak hours. In 1990, the complete station was mothballed until 2008 when the unit 9 was the first to be recommissioned under Eskom's return-to-service project. The full station was put online in 2011. It was finally decommissioned on 31 October 2022.

Power generation
The station consists of a total of 9 units having five 100MW units on the East (1-5) and four 125MW units on the West (6-9) with a total installed capacity of 1,000MW. Turbine Maximum Continuous Rating is 30.00%.

See also 

 Eskom
 Fossil-fuel power plant
 List of power stations in South Africa

References

External links
 Komati Power Station on the Eskom-Website

Coal-fired power stations in South Africa
Towers in South Africa
Buildings and structures in Mpumalanga
Economy of Mpumalanga